The following is a list of all butterflies found in the geographical realm of China divided by families. Temperate North China is located in Central Asia and the Palearctic realm. The rest of China, including the tropical South China (with Hainan, Hong Kong), and Taiwan belong to the Indomalayan realm. In many parts of China the Palearctic and Oriental faunas overlap. This list includes species recorded from Tian Shan, Amur and Ussuri. There are 1,317 species recorded from China.

History of study

Early work on the butterfly fauna of China was undertaken by European entomologists: Edward Donovan, John Henry Leech, Henry John Elwes, Charles Oberthür, Ernest Grandidier, Otto Staudinger, Hans Fruhstorfer, Alfred Otto Herz, Arthur Poujade, Pierre Joseph Michel Lorquin, Paul Mabille, Sergei Alphéraky and Rudolf Püngeler furnish examples. Thousands of plant, insect and mammal species were described in the 19th century by scientists of the Muséum national d'histoire naturelle, Paris, in connection with permanent settlements of missionaries of the Missions étrangères de Paris in north-west Yunnan. The extreme south of Yunnan province, just to the north of Laos has tropical forests and the biological diversity of this area is the most abundant in China. In the early 20th century the faunal studies of European workers on China were summarised in Die Gross-Schmetterlinge der Erde edited by Adalbert Seitz. In the 1930s, Wong Chi-yu, Chou Io and Miss NgYukchau published reports on butterfly species of Zhejiang, Guangdong provinces and Chuankang Area and Ningbo (Zhejiang Province) respectively. Rudolf Mell, director of the German-Chinese Middle School at Canton (Guangzhou) published notes on butterflies in Beiträge zur Fauna sinica (Deut. ent. Zeit.) and other works. From the 1960s to the 1980s, Lee Chuan-lung published revisionary works and descriptions of a number of new species of butterflies from China. Some of these were collected during Sino-Soviet expeditions to Chinese Central Asia when Chinese entomologists worked with their Russian counterparts. Iconographia Insectorum Shensi-corum: Rhopalocera was published in 1978 by the then Northwestern College of Agriculture. Following that, books on the butterfly fauna of Gansu, Hunan (Chenzhou), Guangxi, Guangdong (Lingnan), Henan and Zhejiang were published and also checklists of the butterflies of Jiangxi, Shandong, Ningxia and Xinjiang. In 1992, The Atlas of Chinese Butterflies was published by Lee Chuan-lung. In 1994, Monographia Rhopalocerorum Sinensium edited by Chou Io was published, summarising studies by forty-nine lepidopterists from all over China, including Hong Kong and Taiwan. In 1996 the Butterfly Association of the Entomological Society of China was founded. It is based in the Northwestern Agricultural University. Chou Io revised Monographia Rhopalocerorum Sinensium in 1998 in Classification and Identification of Chinese Butterflies Field Identification Guide. Other and more recent work appears in Acta Zootaxonomica Sinica

Lists per family
 Papilionidae - swallowtail butterflies
 Hesperiidae - skipper butterflies
 Pieridae - whites and yellows
 Lycaenidae - blues, hairstreaks and gossamer-winged butterflies
 Riodinidae - metalmarks
 Nymphalidae - brush-footed butterflies

Geography
Right is a physical map of Siberia. China shares this region and many of its butterflies. The South region belongs to Indomalayan realm and shares species with Indochina.

See also

Geography of China
Provinces of China
List of ecoregions in China
Kunming Institute of Zoology
List of butterflies of the Korean Peninsula
List of butterflies of Indochina
List of butterflies of Taiwan
Félix Biet collected for Oberthür
Armand David collected for Oberthür
Théodore Monbeig collected for Oberthür
Père Jean Marie Delavay collected for Oberthür
Auguste Desgodins collected for Oberthür
Théodore Monbeig collected for Oberthür
Gustave Arthur Poujade
André Soulié

References

Bernard D'Abrera Butterflies of the Oriental Region. Part 1 (1981) Papilionidae, Pieridae, Danaidae Part 2 (1983) Nymphalidae, Satyridae, Amathusidae  Part 3 (1986) Lycaenidae, Riodinidae  Hill House Publishers Lansdowne Editions.
Evans, 1949 A Catalogue of the Hesperiidae from Europe, Asia and Australia in the British Museum Cat. Hesp. Europe Asia Australia British Museum: 1–502, pl. 1-53
Leech, J. H. 1891 New Species of Rhopalocera from Western China Entomologist 24 (Suppl.): 57–61, 66-68
Leech, 1893 Butterflies from China, Japan, and Corea three volumes
Moore, 1884 Descriptions of some new Asiatic diurnal Lepidoptera; chiefly from specimens contained in the Indian Museum, Calcutta Journal of the Asiatic Society of Bengal 53 Pt.II (1): 16-52
Oberthür,C. 1886 Espèces Nouvelles de Lépidoptères du Thibet Nouveaux Lépidoptères du Thibet Études d'Entomologie. 11: 13–38, pl. 1-7
Otto Staudinger, 1886–1889. Centralasiatische Lepidopteren. Stettiner Entomologische Zeitung 47: 193-215, 225-256; 48:49-102; 49: 1-64; 50:16-60.
Staudinger, O., 1887. Neue Arten und Varietäten von Lepidopteren aus dem Amur-gebeit. In Romanoff Mémoires sur les lépidoptères 3: 126-232, pls 6-12,16,17
Sergei Alphéraky, 1889 Lépidoptères rapportés de ia Chine et de la Mongolie par G. N. Potanine in Romanoff, Mémoires sur les lépidoptères 5: 90-123, pl. 5
Chou, I0 (ed) 1994. Monographia Rhopalocerorum Sinensium (Monograph of Chinese Butterflies). Henan Scientific and Technological Publishing House, Zhengzhou.(in Chinese).. Lists 1,227 species in 327 genera. There are 41 species and 44 subspecies newly described, as well, plus new distribution records for China. New species descriptions are noted in English . Colour photographs of the species treated, with accompanying Chinese text.
Chou Io,1998 Classification and Identification of Chinese Butterflies Field Identification Guide 848 colour photos derived from Monographia Rhopalocerorum Sinensium  Lists 1,317 species from China, 92 more species than those in Monographia Rhopalocerorum Sinensium (1994). Three new tribes have been established.
Department of Plant Protection, Northwestern China Agricultural Institute. 1978. Iconographia Insectorum Shensicorum. Lepidoptera: Rhopalocera. Shaanxi People Press (Shan Xi Ren Min Chu Ban She), Xi'an, Shaanxi, China. 81p
Sugiyama, 1999 New butterflies from western China 6. Pallarge 7:
Johnson, 1992 The Palaearctic "Elfin" Butterflies (Lycaenidae, Theclinae) Neue Entomologische Nachrichten 29: 3-141
Huang, 2001 Report of H. Huang's 2000 Expedition to SE. Tibet for Rhopalocera Neue Entomologische Nachrichten 51: 65-152
Huang, 2002 Some new Butterflies from China 2 Atalanta 33 (1/2): 109-122
Huang & Xue, 2004 Notes on some Chinese butterflies Neue Entomologische Nachrichten 57: 171–177, pl. 14
H. Huang 2002: Some new satyrids of the tribe Lethini from China. Atalanta 33 (3/4): 361–372.
Huang, 2003 A list of butterflies collected from Nujiang (Lou Tse Kiang) and Dulongiang, China with descriptions of new species, and revisional notes Neue Entomologische Nachrichten 55: 3-114
Huang & Wu, 2003 New and little known Chinese butterflies in the collection of the Institute of Zoology, Academia Sinica, Beijing - 1 Neue Entomologische Nachrichten 55: 115-143
Huang & Xue, 2004 A Contribution to the Butterfly Fauna of Southern Yunnan Neue Entomologische Nachrichten 57: 135–154, pl. 11 
Lee Chuan-lung 1960s to 1980s New Chinese Butterflies Acta Entomologica Sinica etc.
Forster, 1940 Neue Lycaeniden-Formen aus China. 1 Mitteilungen der Münchner Entomologischen Gesellschaft 30: 870–883, pl. 22-24
Seitz, A., 1912a-1927. Die Palaearktischen Tagfalter. Grossschmetterlinge Erde 1: 8-379 online in German, online in English
Ludwig Carl Friedrich Graeser, 1888-9 Beiträge zur Kenntnis der Lepidopteren-Fauna des Amurlandes Berl. Ent. Zs. 32 (1): 33-153 (1888), (2): 309-414 (1889)
Seitz, A. ,1927 Die indo-australischen Tagfalter Die exotischen Großschmetterlinge, 1197 Seiten 177 Tafeln.
Paul Mabille, 1876 Sur la classification des Hesperiens avec la description de plusieurs espèces nouvelles. Annales de la Société Entomologique de France (5)251-274.
Yoshino, K., 1995- 2003 New butterflies from China 1–8. Nota Lepidoptera and Futao.
Weiss, J.-C. 1992. The Parnassiinae of the World. Part 2. Sciences Nat, Venette; 87 pp.
Key Works Walter Forster

External links
Catalogue of life China List provided by Chinese Academy of Sciencesonline here
Butterflies of China at Digital Moths of Japan. Includes images.
Wikispecies taxonomy additional references via species or genus
Acta Zootaxonomica Sinica
Euroleps Butterflies of the Palearctic
Futao ISSN 0916-1112 Series website

China
Lists of biota of China